Finger on the Trigger may refer to:
Finger on the Trigger (film), a 1965 western film directed by Sidney W. Pink
 "Love Is in Control (Finger on the Trigger)", first single from Donna Summer's self-titled 1982 album
"Finger on the Trigger" (song), a 1988 song by The Angels
"Finger on the Trigger", a bonus track on the CD reissue of Raven's 1987 album Life's a Bitch